Cadurca is a genus of moths in the subfamily Lymantriinae. The genus was erected by Charles Swinhoe in 1906.

Species
Cadurca venata Swinhoe, 1906 Angola
Cadurca moco Collenette, 1936 Angola
Cadurca dianeura (Hering, 1928) Tanzania

References

Lymantriinae